James Wylie House, also known as The Shamrock, O'Connell House, and Hanna House, is a historic home located at White Sulphur Springs, Greenbrier County, West Virginia. It was built before 1825, and is a -story, red brick house with a Georgian style floorplan.  A remodeling executed in 1906, added Italianate style design elements to the roofline and window openings.  Also on the property is a settlement period, two story log cabin and a miniature stone replica of a castle.  It is operated as a bed and breakfast.

It was listed on the National Register of Historic Places in 1990.

References

External links
James Wylie House Bed and Breakfast website

Bed and breakfasts in West Virginia
Houses on the National Register of Historic Places in West Virginia
Georgian architecture in West Virginia
Italianate architecture in West Virginia
Houses completed in 1906
Houses in Greenbrier County, West Virginia
National Register of Historic Places in Greenbrier County, West Virginia
1906 establishments in West Virginia